() is one of ten urban districts of the prefecture-level city of Hangzhou, the capital of Zhejiang Province, in East China, it is located in the core urban area of Hangzou. It is across the Qiantang River from West Lake and the older parts of Hangzhou. Like Pudong in Shanghai, it a very modern, and rapidly developing, area that was mostly farmland until ten years ago. The district people's government is situated on Xixing Road.

Toponymy 
The district's name is derived from its geographic location along the Qiantang River, and literally translates to river bank.

History 
The area of present-day Binjiang District belonged to the ancient Chinese state of Yue.

During the Japanese invasion of China, most townships in Xiaoshan County were occupied or semi-occupied by the Japanese army.

In 1947, Heshang District was established within Xiaoshan County as a county-controlled district.

The area came under control of the People's Republic of China in May 1949.

In September 1958, people's communes were established throughout nearly all of Xiaoshan County. They remained commonplace in Xiaoshan County until their abolition in May 1984.

On May 8, 1996, Xiaoshan was merged into nearby Xihu District.

On December 12, 1996, Binjiang District was created, with the three towns which formerly belonged to Xiaoshan.

The district's three towns were upgraded to subdistricts on December 3, 2003.

In August 2015, Binjiang District was approved as China's tenth .

Geography 
Binjiang District is bordered by Xiaoshan District to its east and south, and by the Qiantang River to its north and west. Across the Qiantang River lies Jianggan District, Shangcheng District, and Xihu District.

Administrative divisions

These subdistricts are then further divided into 53 residential communities.

Demographics 

Economy

As of 2020, Binjiang District's gross domestic product (GDP) totals 174.57 billion renminbi (RMB), and posted a growth rate of 7.2%. In 2019, Binjiang District's GDP totaled ¥159.22 billion, and grew at a rate of 8.2%.

In 2020, Binjiang District's primary sector accounted for just 0.03% of its GDP, while its secondary sector accounted for 46.34% of it, and its tertiary sector was responsible for 53.62% of it.

Binjiang District is a major corporate center within China, and some of the country's largest private enterprises have headquarters or major offices in the district. Geely, a major automotive manufacturing company which was the 10th largest private enterprise in China as of 2020, has its headquarters in the district. Other large companies headquartered in Binjiang District include video surveillance company Dahua Technology, appliance company Supor, and logistics company . Other major firms with a presence in Binjiang District include Alibaba, NetEase, Hikvision, Uniview, CHINT Group, Supcon, and Focused Photonics.

Transportation

Metro 
Binjiang District is served by three lines on the Hangzhou Metro: Line 1, Line 5, and Line 6.

Line 1 
The district is home to four metro stations on Line 1: Jiangling Road station, Binhe Road station, Xixing station, and Binkang Road station.

Line 5 
The district is home to four metro stations on Line 5: Changhe station, Jucai Road station, Jianghui Road station, and Binkang Road station.

Line 6 
The district is home to ten metro stations on Line 6: Xipu Road station, Zhejiang Chinese Medical University station, Weiye Road station, Chengye Road station, Jianye Road station, Changhe station, Jianghan Road station, Jiangling Road station, Xingmin station, and Olympic Sports Center station.

Road 
 
 S4 Airport Expressway
 Zhonghe Elevated Bridge
 Guanshan Tunnel

References

Geography of Hangzhou
Districts of Zhejiang